Imre Puskás (born July 20, 1966) is a Hungarian jurist and politician, member of the National Assembly (MP) from Fidesz Tolna County Regional List from 2010 to 2014.

He joined Fidesz in 1998. Puskás was elected President of the General Assembly of Tolna County in 2006. He was also a deputy mayor of Bátaszék for a short time in that year. He was a member of the Committee on Cultural and Press Affairs from May 14, 2010 to June 18, 2012. He was elected Vice Chairman of the Committee on Audit Office and Budget on June 18, 2012. He worked in the Constitutional, Judicial and Standing Orders Committee between March 13, 2013 and May 13, 2013. In 2014 he was appointed as Deputy State Secretariat of Cultural Heritage.

References

1966 births
Living people
Hungarian jurists
Fidesz politicians
Members of the National Assembly of Hungary (2010–2014)
People from Szekszárd